Ryser is a surname. Notable people with the surname include:

Dany Ryser (born 1957), Swiss football manager
H. J. Ryser (1923–1985), American mathematician
Fritz Ryser (1873–1916), Swiss cyclist

See also 
Bruck–Ryser–Chowla theorem, is a result in graph theory and combinatorial matrix theory
Gale–Ryser theorem, is a result in graph theory and combinatorial matrix theory